Anastasia "Stacey" Travers is an American politician, scientist, and U.S. Army veteran. She is a Democratic member of the Arizona House of Representatives elected to represent District 12 in 2022.

Life 
Travers was born in Athens to a U.S. military father and a Greek mother. She served in the U.S. Army as a Russian Intelligence Interceptor. She completed a B.S. in geosciences from the University of Arizona. She conducted postgraduate studies at the University of Oxford. She worked with disabled veterans and the unsheltered in the United Kingdom. When she returned to the United States, she worked in West Los Angeles and was a legislative liaison in Sacramento, California. Travers worked for AMVETS and advocated for veteran women's issues, the homeless, and disabled. She also advocated for the Pacific branch of the National Home for Disabled Veteran Soldiers.

Travers was elected to the Arizona House of Representatives in 2022. She serves on the military affairs and public safety and the natural resources energy and water committees.

Travers has two children.

References

External links 

 
 Biography at Ballotpedia

Democratic Party members of the Arizona House of Representatives
Living people
Year of birth missing (living people)
21st-century American women politicians
Women state legislators in Arizona
21st-century American politicians
American people of Greek descent
Politicians from Athens
Female United States Army personnel
University of Arizona alumni